The Steps of Cincinnati refers to the collection of approximately 400 sets of city-owned steps in Cincinnati, Ohio, in the United States. The steps are considered a unique and integral mode of transportation in the city. In addition to practical use, the steps offer recreational users exercise and serve as a scenic attraction to tourists.

Overview
Cincinnati is a city of hills. While not a literal description, the city has long been given the nickname "The City of Seven Hills", a metaphorical reference to the seven hills of Rome. Before the advent of the automobile this system of stairways provided pedestrians important and convenient access to and from their hilltop homes. The first steps were installed by residents of Mount Auburn in the 1830s in order to gain easier access to Findlay Market in Over-the-Rhine.

Over the years, some of the steps have fallen into disuse and disrepair, leading to calls from preservationists to restore the historic steps. Conversely, some area residents want nearby steps closed because they fear the often poorly lit steps offer refuge to criminals. In response, the City has formed the City Hillside Step Information System and made it responsible for evaluating the condition of the steps and making needed repairs.  Commemorative markers were placed in the neighborhood of Mount Adams at the Oregon Street Steps and Park Street Steps. Despite these efforts, some of the steps remain at risk of closure.

Religious significance
The Steps of Cincinnati are central to a perennial Cincinnati tradition. Since 1860, the faithful ascend 85 steps of the Roman Catholic Immaculata Church on Good Friday to the church's front door from the neighborhood below while praying the Rosary. An additional 65 steps start at the base of Mt. Adams, with a pedestrian bridge over Columbia Parkway connecting the two paths. The steps were originally made of wood, but in 1911, the City of Cincinnati helped the church build concrete steps. In 1958 and 2009, the city again rebuilt the now 96 steps leading to the church.

Further reading
The guidebook Walking the Steps of Cincinnati (Ohio University Press) by Mary Anna DuSablon, a Cincinnati-born author, contains hundreds of city steps with 35 walking tours.

See also
Steps of Pittsburgh
Step street

References

External links
Interactive map of the Steps of Cincinnati 
 "Praying the Steps," a poem set on Mount Adams, Cincinnati in the book, Vertical Bridges: Poems and Photographs of City Steps by Paola Corso

Transportation buildings and structures in Cincinnati
Stairways in the United States